Tayyibah Girls' School, is an all-girl independent Islamic primary and secondary educational institute that caters for girls from ages 4 to 16. It is located in Hackney, London, United Kingdom.

History
Tayyibah Educational Trust was established in September 1992, with the aim of providing a high quality, excellent moral and academic education for girls in Hackney. Tayyibah Girls School is the flagship project of the trust.

The humble beginning was in a basement flat in Cazenove Road, Stamford Hill, with just 4 girls. Today there is a full primary and secondary school. The school moved to its current premises in 1993. Further extension was made to the building to improve the facilities available to its students.

One of the central aims of the school has been to provide an excellent education to its students equipping them for their lives ahead. Tayyibah Girls School over the years has been constantly been the top performing school in the Borough. Its Alumni have progressed into many professions including Medicine, Law, Education and Islamic Scholarship.

External links
BBC News statistics on Tayyibah Girls' School
Department for Children, Schools and Families background information for Tayyibah Girls' School
Salaam article about Tayyibah Girls' School

Private schools in the London Borough of Hackney
Educational institutions established in 1992
Private girls' schools in London
1992 establishments in England
Islamic schools in London